The Duilong River, or Duilong Qu (Tibetan: Toelung), is a right tributary of the Lhasa River, which it enters just below the city of Lhasa, Tibet, China. Water quality may be compromised by dissolved substances including arsenic from geothermal springs.

Course

The valley of the Duilong River leads south to the Lhasa River, and is contained by two ridges of the Nianqing Tanggula Mountains.
The Duilong has hydro-electrical power generation capacity of 4,000  KW.
The non-monsoon season lasts from October to May each year, and the monsoon season from June to October. 80% of the precipitation is in the monsoon season, when warm and moist air is transported to the Tibet Plateau from the south Indian Ocean.

The Qinghai–Tibet Railway approaches Lhasa from the northwest. It descends from the Amdo grasslands to Nagchu and Damshung, and then follows the Toelung River from Yangpachen through Toelung Dechen county into west Lhasa. A new railway bridge was built over the Lhasa river to link the station in Liuwu township on the south side of the river to central Lhasa on the north side.

Water quality

The southern Tibetan Plateau is tectonically active, and contains many geothermal springs.
Although rivers in Tibet are generally considered to be clean, the water of the Duilong is affected by these springs. A 2015 study reported that during the non-monsoon season the levels of arsenic in the river, at 205.6 μg/L were higher than the WHO guideline of 10 μg/L for drinking water.
The source of the pollution seems to be untreated water from the Yangbajain Geothermal Field power station.

Yangjinshi Reservoir

A 1995 paper concluded that proposed Yangjinshi Reservoir would provide a good balance between the conflicting demands for irrigation and hydroelectric power generation. It could not be built in the lower reaches, where the river is paralleled by the Qinghai-Xizang Road, or in the middle reach where it would cover the Yangbajain geothermal field.
The project would include a 4500 kW power station.

References

Sources

Rivers of Lhasa
Tributaries of the Brahmaputra River
Doilungdêqên District
Damxung County